Utva Aviation Industry (commonly known as UTVA) is a Serbian manufacturer of general aviation aircraft, subsidiary of Yugoimport SDPR, headquartered in Pančevo.

History

Utva was founded on 5 June 1937 in Zemun, since 1940 located in Pančevo, produced simple gliders. In 1939 Utva began manufacturing light piston engine aircraft. During the NATO bombing of Yugoslavia in 1999, the factory was heavily damaged.

In 2017, Serbian defence company Yugoimport SDPR became the majority stakeholder of Utva with around 96% of total shares.

Products

Aircraft

Gliders

Unmanned aerial vehicles

See also
 Aero East Europe Sila
 Defense industry of Serbia
 Aircraft industry of Serbia

References

Footnotes

Notes

External links

 
 An unofficial information website 

1937 establishments in Serbia
2017 mergers and acquisitions
Aircraft manufacturers of Serbia
Aircraft manufacturers of Yugoslavia
Companies based in Pančevo
Defense companies of Serbia
Defense industry of Serbia
Serbian brands
Unmanned aerial vehicle manufacturers
Vehicle manufacturing companies established in 1937